Franklin County is  a county in the Commonwealth of Pennsylvania. As of the 2020 census, the population was 155,932 Its county seat is Chambersburg.

Franklin County comprises the Chambersburg–Waynesboro, PA Metropolitan Statistical Area, which is also included in the Washington–Baltimore combined statistical area. It lies to a large extent within the Cumberland Valley.

History
Originally part of Lancaster County (1729), then York County (1749), then Cumberland County (1750), Franklin County became an independent jurisdiction on September 9, 1784, relatively soon after the end of the American Revolutionary War.  It is named in honor of Founding Father Benjamin Franklin.

Geography

Franklin County is in the watershed of the Chesapeake Bay and the overwhelming majority of it is drained by the Potomac River, but the Conodoguinet Creek and the Sherman Creek drain northeastern portions into the Susquehanna River. It has a hot-summer humid continental climate (Dfa) and its hardiness zone is 6b. Average monthly temperatures in Chambersburg range from 29.9 °F in January to 74.7 °F in July.

Adjacent counties
Juniata County (north)
Perry County (northeast)
Cumberland County (northeast)
Huntingdon County (Northwest)
Adams County (east)
Frederick County, Maryland (southeast)
Washington County, Maryland (south)
Fulton County (west)

Major highways

Demographics

As of the census of 2000, there were 129,313 people, 50,633 households, and 36,405 families residing in the county.  The population density was 168 people per square mile (65/km2).  There were 53,803 housing units at an average density of 70 per square mile (27/km2).  The racial makeup of the county was 95.33% White, 2.33% Black or African American, 0.15% Native American, 0.55% Asian, 0.03% Pacific Islander, 0.74% from other races, and 0.86% from two or more races.  1.75% of the population were Hispanic or Latino of any race. 40.2% were of German, 19.4% American, 7.6% Irish and 6.0% English ancestry. 96.0% spoke English and 2.1% Spanish as their first language.

There were 50,633 households, out of which 30.80% had children under the age of 18 living with them, 60.00% were married couples living together, 8.20% had a female householder with no husband present, and 28.10% were non-families. 23.70% of all households were made up of individuals, and 10.70% had someone living alone who was 65 years of age or older.  The average household size was 2.49 and the average family size was 2.94.

In the county, the population was spread out, with 24.00% under the age of 18, 7.90% from 18 to 24, 28.20% from 25 to 44, 23.70% from 45 to 64, and 16.00% who were 65 years of age or older.  The median age was 38 years. For every 100 females there were 94.80 males.  For every 100 females age 18 and over, there were 91.90 males.

In 2001, Franklin County was featured in David Brooks' article "One Nation, Slightly Divisible" in The Atlantic as a representative Red or Republican Party county.

2020 Census

Government

County commissioners
 David Keller, Chairman, Republican
 John Flannery, Republican
 Robert Ziobrowski, Democrat

Other county offices 

 Clerk of Courts, Todd Rock
 Controller, Harold Wissinger
 Coroner, Jeff Conner
 District Attorney, Matthew Fogal
 Prothonotary, Timothy Sponseller
 Register and Recorder, Linda Miller
 Sheriff, Dane Anthony
 Treasurer, Melody Shuman

State House of Representatives
 Jesse Topper, Republican, Pennsylvania's 78th Representative District
 Adam Harris, Republican, Pennsylvania's 82nd Representative District
 Rob W. Kauffman, Republican, Pennsylvania's 89th Representative District
 Paul Schemel, Republican, Pennsylvania's 90th Representative District

State Senate
 Judy Ward, Republican, Pennsylvania's 30th Senatorial District
 Doug Mastriano, Republican, Pennsylvania's 33rd Senatorial District

United States House of Representatives
 John Joyce, Republican, Pennsylvania's 13th congressional district

Politics 
For most of its history, Franklin County has been a Republican Party stronghold in presidential elections, with only three Democratic Party candidates having managed to win the county from 1880 to the present day. The most recent Democrat to win the county in a presidential election was Lyndon B. Johnson, who won state-wide in the Pennsylvania election and in the national election, in a 1964 landslide. As a testament to the county's status as a Republican Party stronghold, Jimmy Carter in 1976 is the lone Democrat to win forty percent of the county's votes since Johnson's 1964 win.

|}

United States Senate
 John Fetterman, Democrat
Bob Casey, Democrat

Education

Universities and colleges
 Wilson College
 Penn State Mont Alto

Technology school
 Franklin County Career and Technology Center
Chambersburg Area Career Magnet School
Triangle Tech

Intermediate unit
Lincoln Intermediate Unit (IU#12) region includes: Adams County, Franklin County and York County. The agency offers school districts, home-schooled students and private schools many services, including: special education services, combined purchasing, and instructional technology services. It runs Summer Academy, which offers both art and academic strands designed to meet the individual needs of gifted, talented and high achieving students. Additional services include: curriculum mapping, professional development for school employees,  adult education, nonpublic school services, business services, migrant & ESL (English as a second language), instructional services, special education, management services, and technology services. It also provides a GED program to adults who want to earn a high school diploma and literacy programs. The Lincoln Intermediate Unit is governed by a 13-member board of directors, each a member of a local school board from the 25 school districts. Board members are elected by school directors of all 25 school districts for three-year terms that begin July 1. There are 29 intermediate units in Pennsylvania. They are funded by school districts, state and federal program specific funding and grants. IUs do not have the power to tax.

Public school districts
 Chambersburg Area School District
 Fannett-Metal School District (also in Perry County)
 Greencastle-Antrim School District
 Shippensburg Area School District (also in Cumberland County)
 Tuscarora School District
 Waynesboro Area School District

Private schools

 Anchor Christian Day School – Shippensburg
 Antrim Mennonite School – Greencastle
 Brook Side Amish School – Spring Run
 Calvary Mennonite School – Chambersburg
 Clearfield Parochial School – Shippensburg
 Conococheague Amish School – Spring Run
 Corpus Christi Catholic School – Chambersburg
 Cornell Abraxas Leadership Development Program
 Cornell Abraxas Youth Center – South Mountain
 Culbertson Mennonite School – Chambersburg
 Cumberland Valley Christian School – Chambersburg
 Emmanuel Christian School – Chambersburg
 Franklin Learning Center – Chambersburg
 Highfield Christian Academy – Blue Ridge Summit
 Living Word Academy – Blue Ridge Summit
 Maple Grove Amish School Dry Run
 McClays Mill Amish School – Newburg
 Meadow Brook Amish School – Spring Run
 Manito Day Treatment – Chambersburg
 Mercersburg Academy – Mercersburg
 Montessori Academy of Chambersburg
 Mountain View Amish School – Spring Run
 Mowersville Christian Academy – Newburg
 Noahs Ark Christian Church Center – Waynesboro
 Otterbein School – Shippensburg
 Path Valley Christian School – Doylesburg
 Portico River Brethren School – Chambersburg
 Providence School – Waynesboro
 St. Andrew the Apostle Catholic School – Waynesboro
 Shady Grove Mennonite School – Greencastle
 Shalom Christian Academy – Chambersburg
 South Mountain Secure Treatment Unit – South Mountain
 Stoney Creek Parochial School – Orrstown
 Sunset Amish School – Newburg
 Sweetwater Ridge School – Dry Run
 Sylvan Learning Center – Chambersburg
 Tunnel Run School – Newburg
 Visionquest-South Mountain Lodge – South Mountain
 Willow Hill Parochial School – Willow Hill

Libraries
The Franklin County Library system has five branches: 
Blue Ridge Summit Free Library – Blue Ridge Summit
Coyle Free Library – Chambersburg
Grove Family Library – Chambersburg
Lilian S Besore Memorial Library – Greencastle
St Thomas Branch Library – Saint Thomas
The system also supports the Alexander Hamilton Memorial Library in Waynesboro, PA. In addition, the system currently operates two bookmobiles.

Recreation
There are four Pennsylvania state parks in Franklin County.
Caledonia State Park straddles the Franklin and Adams County line along U.S. Route 30 between Chambersburg and Gettysburg.
Buchanan's Birthplace State Park is the birthplace of the 15th President of the United States, James Buchanan.
Mont Alto State Park is the oldest state park in Pennsylvania.
Cowans Gap State Park is largely surrounded by Buchanan State Forest and straddles the Franklin and Fulton County border.

Communities

Under Pennsylvania law, there are four types of incorporated municipalities: cities, boroughs, townships, and, in at most two cases, towns. The following boroughs and townships are located in Franklin County:

Boroughs
Chambersburg (county seat)
Greencastle
Mercersburg
Mont Alto
Orrstown
Shippensburg (mostly in Cumberland County)
Waynesboro

Townships

Antrim Township
Fannett Township
Greene Township
Guilford Township
Hamilton Township
Letterkenny Township
Lurgan Township
Metal Township
Montgomery Township
Peters Township
Quincy Township
Southampton Township
St. Thomas Township
Warren Township
Washington Township

Census-designated places
Census-designated places are geographical areas designated by the U.S. Census Bureau for the purposes of compiling demographic data. They are not actual jurisdictions under Pennsylvania law. Other unincorporated communities, such as villages, may be listed here as well.

Blue Ridge Summit
Fayetteville
Fort Loudon
Guilford
Marion
Pen Mar
Rouzerville
Scotland
State Line
Wayne Heights

Population ranking
The population ranking of the following table is based on the 2010 census of Franklin County.

† county seat

See also
 National Register of Historic Places listings in Franklin County, Pennsylvania
 Bloom Brothers Department Stores

References

 
1784 establishments in Pennsylvania
Populated places established in 1784